Norman Arnheim is an American biologist specializing in aging and development biology, biochemistry, and molecular biology. He is currently a Distinguished Professor and the Ester Dornsife Chair at the University of Southern California, and an Elected Fellow of the American Association for the Advancement of Science.

References

Year of birth missing (living people)
Living people
University of Southern California faculty
21st-century American biologists